Bhendi Bazaar is a market (bazaar) in South Mumbai, Maharashtra, India. Bhendi Bazaar occupies an area between Mohammed Ali Road and Khetwadi. The closest Central and Harbour lines station for the Mumbai Suburban Railway is Sandhurst Road, and the closest Western railway stations are Charni Road and Grant Road. The bazaar is popular for shopping viz antique and hardware items. It is also home to the popular Bhendibazaar gharana of Hindustani classical music.

There are other markets surrounding Bhendi Bazaar such as Crawford Market (Phule Market), Chor Bazaar, Nul Bazaar, and other smaller ones.

Etymology 
As per Samuel Townsend Sheppard, Bhendi Bazaar gets its name from the row of Hibiscus populnea (locally called Bhendi) located north of Pydhonie. According to Sir George Christopher Molesworth Birdwood, "the Bhendy tree is Thespesia populnea, in Southern India, commonly called Portia, a favourite ornamental tree, thriving best near the sea. In Ceylon, it is called Saria gansuri and also the Tulip tree." 

Another theory posits that name comes from the British living on the southern division of the Crawford Market (or Crawford Bazaar), who used to call the northern side of Crawford Market - "behind the Bazaar", which the local people started calling Bhindi or Bhendi Bazaar (phonetically similar to the Indian term for Okra - bhindi).

History 
During the British Raj, Bhendi Bazaar was built as a labor camp for workers, engaged in the development of Bombay, to stay in. The buildings of the labor camp were later sold to private owners who in turn accommodated tenants based on the local pagri system.

, the area is set to be revamped with the project being undertaken by the Saifee Burhani Upliftment Trust initiated by Mohammed Burhanuddin, head of the Dawoodi Bohra community.

Demographics and culture 
Bhendi Bazaar is primarily a Muslim-populated area, home to Muslims with origins in all parts of India, especially Maharashtra, Gujarat, Kerala and northern India. Shop-owners and hawkers in this market belong to different religious groups.

Old streets like Saifee Jubilee Street, Khara Tank Road, Dhabu Street (now called Raudat Tahera Street), Pakmodia Street, Zainabia Marg, Tokra Gulli, 1st Cooper Street, 2nd Cooper Street, 3rd Cooper Street, and Chor Bazaar (consisting of Mutton Street and Chimna Butcher street) are populated by Bohri Muslims of the Dawoodi Bohra (a sect of Ismaili Shia Islam) among other Muslim sects.

The area houses Raudat Tahera, the mausoleum of the 51st and 52nd Dai-al-Mutlaq of the Dawoodi Bohras, Taher Saifuddin and Mohammed Burhanuddin. Bhendi Bazaar has the first two wing high-story tower of its own named Al-Saadah.

Bhendi Bazaar is famous for the food delicacies that it has to offer, it has been called 'A Glutton's Guide To Mumbai's Best Bohri Mohalla Food Joints'. A 2010 Bollywood film, Bhindi Bazaar, was shot in the area.

The famous Bollywood singer Mohammad Rafi lived in Bhendi Bazaar when he moved to Bombay from Lahore in the early 1940s. Rafi started his career in playback singing whilst living in a small apartment in Bhendi Bazaar.

Places to visit in Bhendi Bazaar

Famous mouth-watering eateries and kothas in Bhendi Bazaar 

 Shabbir's Tawakkal Sweets
 Taj Ice Cream
 Jilani Fast Food Corner
 Surti 12 Handi
 Imdadiya Bakery
 Haji Seekh Corner
 Idris Cold Drink
 Kunafa Bytes
 Badshah Sweets
 Imam Sherbat
 Tawakkal Sweets

Topi and Paghri shops 
Dawoodi Amama Makers

Calcutta Fetahwala

Muffadal Pagdi

See also

References

Retail markets in Mumbai
Bazaars in India